Cal Miskaad (also Calmiskaad, Al Miskad;) is a mountain range in Somalia.  It stretches across an area between the east of Karin, Somalia, to the tip of the Horn of Africa. Its peak sits at almost  in Bahaya, east of Bosaso. ISIS has a base in the range, consisting mainly of former Al-Shabaab fighters. Places in Cal Miskaad include Biyo Kulule, Hantaara, Habeeno, 
Baalade, El Dhurre 

.

See also
Golis Mountains

References

Mountain ranges of Somalia
Bari, Somalia